The 1999 Detroit Tigers season was the team's 121st season and—after nearly a century of baseball at the corner of Michigan and Trumbull Avenues—its 88th and final season at Tiger Stadium.  The team had a record of 69–92 and finished in third place of the American League Central,  games behind the Cleveland Indians. On September 27, 1999, Robert Fick had the final hit of the final game at Tiger Stadium, a rooftop grand slam, which was the stadium's 11,111th home run. In the 2000 season, the Tigers moved to Comerica Park.

Offseason
October 6, 1998: Doug Bochtler was selected off waivers by the Los Angeles Dodgers from the Detroit Tigers.
December 14, 1998: Bill Haselman was signed as a free agent with the Detroit Tigers.
December 18, 1998: Luis Polonia was signed as a free agent with the Detroit Tigers.

Regular season

Highlights

April 12: The Final Opening Day in Tiger Stadium history. Willie Blair and Eric Milton of the Minnesota Twins engaged in a scoreless battle through several innings. The Twins finally won the game in the twelfth inning by a score of 1–0.
April 22: Tood Jones gets career save number 100.
May 6: Gabe Kapler hits his first home run in Tiger Stadium.
May 7–9: The Tigers played the Baltimore Orioles. Shortstop Cal Ripken, Jr. does not appear in one game for the Orioles.
May 15: Alice Cooper tosses out the ceremonial first pitch.
May 16: Tony Clark hits career home run number 100.
May 28: Karim García becomes the 34th player in the history of Major League Baseball to hit a home run over the Tiger Stadium roof in right field.
June 4–6: The Tigers played the St. Louis Cardinals. First baseman Mark McGwire does not hit a home run in the series.

Season standings

Record vs. opponents

Transactions
April 16, 1999: Mel Rojas was traded by the Los Angeles Dodgers with Dave Mlicki to the Detroit Tigers for Robinson Checo, Aposto Garcia (minors), and Richard Roberts (minors).
May 12, 1999: Mel Rojas was released by the Detroit Tigers.

Roster

Final game at Tiger Stadium
The final game at Tiger Stadium was played on September 27, 1999, between the Detroit Tigers and the Kansas City Royals.  The Tigers were victorious 8–2.  The winning pitcher was Detroit starter Brian Moehler.  The losing pitcher was Jeff Suppan.

The pregame ceremony

Prior to the final game at Tiger Stadium, a ceremony was held. It was emceed by then current Tiger broadcaster and Ford C. Frick Award recipient Ernie Harwell. The National Anthem was performed by The Mosaic Youth Theatre of Detroit Singers. At the ceremony, owner Mike Ilitch spoke along with then Michigan governor John Engler, then Detroit mayor Dennis Archer and Commissioner of Baseball Bud Selig. Also featured at the ceremony was longtime Tiger right fielder and Hall of Famer Al Kaline.

Instead of both managers exchanging lineups before the game, both clubs appointed honorary captains. Representing the Tigers was Kaline and representing the Royals was former MVP and Hall of Fame third baseman George Brett.

The postgame ceremony

The game ended at 7:07 pm.  The grounds crew then surrounded home plate.  Groundskeeper Charlie McGee, using a pick axe, dug up home plate at 7:13.  It would then be transported by Tiger pitchers Matt Anderson, Jeff Weaver, and Francisco Cordero, with police escort, to Comerica Park.

Ernie Harwell then read a history of Tiger Stadium accompanied by music from the movie Field of Dreams.  He introduced a film containing images of such Tiger legends as Ty Cobb, Sam Crawford, Hughie Jennings and Harry Heilmann.  In addition, the Tigers Hall of Famers were honored: Heinie Manush, Mickey Cochrane, Charlie Gehringer, Hank Greenberg, Hal Newhouser, George Kell, and Harwell.

Following remarks from Willie Horton and former manager Sparky Anderson, there emerged from the center field gate players from times past, including Mark Fidrych, Bill Freehan, Dick McAuliffe, Dave Bergman, Mickey Stanley, Willie Horton, Kirk Gibson, Cecil Fielder, Al Kaline, the combination of Alan Trammell and Lou Whitaker, and Elden Auker.   A line was formed from the center field flagpole to home plate, along which was passed the flag that had flown from the pole in dead center over the finale.

After Auker passed the flag to catcher Brad Ausmus, players threw souvenirs into the stands as some reached over and put dirt from the warning track into plastic bags.  It was at this time that Harwell gave his final goodbye: "Tonight, we say good-bye. ... Farewell, old friend Tiger Stadium.  We will remember."

At 8:19, the scoreboard was shut off.  At quarter to nine, a final team picture was taken, and by 9 the stands were empty.  As the last of the fans left, a sign was hung on the famous right-center field overhang which read: "Today, there is crying in baseball.  So long, old friend."

Ernie Harwell's farewell

"Ladies and gentlemen, less than six months ago, we began a warm season of farewells, and with each passing day we came a little bit closer to this historic occasion.

"The Lions, Joe Louis and Nelson Mandela.  6,873 regular-season games, 35 postseason contests and a trio of spectacular All-Star Games, Tiger Stadium has been home to this great game of baseball.  But more than anything, it has been a cherished home to our memories.

"Will you remember that last base hit? The last out?  How about that last pitch?  Or maybe it's the first time as a child when you saw that green, green grass that will forever be etched into your mind and soul.

"Tonight, we say good-bye.  But we will not forget.  Open your eyes, look around and take a mental picture.  Moments like this shall live on forever.

"It's been 88 moving years at Michigan and Trumbull.   The tradition built here shall endure along with the permanence of the Olde English D.  But tonight we must say good-bye.

"Farewell, old friend Tiger Stadium.  We will remember."

Player stats

Batting

Note: G = Games played; AB = At bats; H = Hits; Avg. = Batting average; HR = Home runs; RBI = Runs batted in

Note: pitchers' batting statistics not included

Pitching

Starting pitchers
Note: G = Games pitched; IP = Innings pitched; W = Wins; L = Losses; ERA = Earned run average; SO = Strikeouts

Relief and other pitchers

Note: G = Games pitched; IP = Innings pitched; W = Wins; L = Losses; ERA = Earned run average; SO = Strikeouts

Farm system

See also

 1999 in baseball

References

External links
 Baseball-Reference.com 1999 Tigers

Detroit Tigers seasons
Detroit Tigers
Detroit
1999 in Detroit